Fox Comedy is an Australian subscription television channel focused on airing popular sitcoms. The channel launched on 7 November 2019 as Fox Hits.

The network rebranded on 1 September 2020 after ten months, merging with sister network The Comedy Channel to become Fox Comedy. Though it shared a similar name to its former sister network Fox Funny (which carried more contemporary sitcoms), Fox Comedy's schedule originally featured sitcoms ranging from the 80s to around the mid-2000s.

On 1 March 2023, with the Fox Funny channel closing, its content moved over to sister channels Fox Comedy and Fox8. On that date, Fox Comedy moved to replaced Fox Funny’s slot

Programming
As of 1 March 2023, the following titles air on Fox Comedy:

3rd Rock from the Sun
Cheers
Everybody Loves Raymond
Frasier
Full House
Friends
The Golden Girls
The Good Place
The Middle
Just Shoot Me!
The King of Queens
Mike & Molly
Mom
 My Name is Earl
The Nanny
NewsRadio
Schitts Creek
Seinfeld
Two And A Half Men
Will & Grace

Former programming
Malcolm in the Middle
How I Met Your Mother

References

External links
 Foxtel Website

2019 establishments in Australia
English-language television stations in Australia
Television networks in Australia
Television channels and stations established in 2019
Foxtel